M.A.W. Shockley (Major August W. Shockley) was a U.S. Army medical corps officer.  He was a veteran of the Philippine–American War, and retired as a brigadier general.

Military career appointments
 Havana, Cuba, 1899, during this assignment he treated soldiers with yellow fever  
 Philippine–American War, 1909 
 Division of Militia Affairs, departed in August 1919 
 Fort Leavenworth, arrived in 1919, Head of the Medical Department at the Army Service School  
 Camp Knox, departed in September 1922 
 William Beaumont Army Medical Center, appointed commander in September 1922 
 Assistant Surgeon General of the Army, appointed in 1925, promoted to brigadier general in 1925 
 Carlisle Barracks, retired from this position on 1 October 1936, commander, brigadier general

M.A.W. Shockley was a member of the Military Order of the Loyal Legion of the United States.

See also
William Beaumont Army Medical Center

Personal life
M.A.W. Shockley's father (William B. Shockley) was a surgeon for the Army of the Cumberland, United States Volunteers, during the American Civil War.

References

United States Army Medical Corps officers
United States Army generals
American surgeons